Crambe is a genus of demosponges belonging to the family Crambeidae.

Species
 Crambe acuata (Lévi, 1958)
 Crambe amarilla Esteves, Lôbo-Hajdu & Hajdu, 2007
 Crambe chilensis Esteves, Lôbo-Hajdu & Hajdu, 2007
 Crambe crambe (Schmidt, 1862)
 Crambe erecta Pulitzer-Finali, 1993
 Crambe maldonadoi Esteves, Lôbo-Hajdu & Hajdu, 2007
 Crambe panamensis Maldonado, Carmona, van Soest & Pomponi, 2001
 Crambe tailliezi Vacelet & Boury-Esnault, 1982
 Crambe tuberosa Maldonado & Benito, 1991

References

 
Taxa named by Gualtherus Carel Jacob Vosmaer